The Kobuzev family (also spelled: Kobyzev, Kobozev, Kobzev; Russian: Кобузевы, originally spelled: Кобузёвы) is an ancient Russian noble family descended from Ryazanian boyar scions.

History 
The family's name stems from the name of the founder – Kobuz. Kobuz was a personal male Slavic Pagan name meaning 'hawk'.. The name has Lechitic origins. In the form of Kobus it is still found in Pomerania. Poles still refer to the Eurasian hobby as 'kobuz' (pronounced as kobus). As a personal name or a nickname, Kobuz (Russian: Кобуз, Кобузь) is found in written sources of the region of the Oka river, particularly the area of Ryazan.<ref>[https://pomnirod.ru/articles/istorii-familii/imena/staroslavyanskie-imena-i-prozvishha-ryazanskoj-zemli-po-dannym-perepisnyh-knig-staroryazanskogo-stana-pereyaslavl-ryazanskogo-uezda-ksvoroncova-velyaminova-162930-i-1636-gg.html See: Оленев М.Б. Старославянские имена и прозвища Рязанской земли (по данным переписных книг Старорязанского стана Переяславль-Рязанского уезда К.С.Воронцова-Вельяминова 1629/30 и 1636 гг.). Май-июнь 2001 г.]</ref> However, it is uncertain what status the family's progenitor had, while the Kobuzev family appears by the late 15th – early 16th centuries in the surviving written sources already with their last name and members of the local landed aristocracy.   

The earliest Kobuzev mentioned so far was 'Vasily Ananyin syn Kobuzev' (meaning: Vasily, son of Ananiy of the Kobuzev family), mentioned in 1491 as a witness on a report to the boyar of the Grand Duke of Ryazan Ivan IV of Ryazan, Ivan Ivanovich 'Inka' Izmaylov, who was then the viceroy in Pereyaslavl of Ryazan and the commander of the Ryazanian troop.

In 1524, his brother, Afanasy Ivanov syn Kobuzev was mentioned as a witness on a deed of land exchange.

By the 17th century the Kobuzev family of Ryazan had at least two allods: the village of Timofeevo (Andreevskoe), sold to the Birkin family in 1601, and the village of Tyutkosvoe, passed to the Likharyov family for overdue mortgage, in Perevitsky stan (now: the district of Zaraysk, Moscow oblast).    

The Kobuzev family served to both the Grand Dukes of Ryazan and the Ryazanian archbishops. In the late 16th century, with the establishment of the unified Moscow government, the family began to serve to the Dukes of Moscow. The Kobuzev family is mentioned in all of the surviving Ryazanian lists of serving gentry: 1604, 1648, and 1676.  

Already in the 16th century some of the family members served as Cossacks. One of the Sviyazhsk Cossack atamans was Alexey Kobyzev, who led a Cossack troop in a battle with the Chuvashy in 1552. The battle was lost and the Cossacks had 70 men fallen.

 Some historical landed estates 
 Timofeevo (Andreevskoe; Russian: деревня Тимофеевская Андреевское тож), a village in Perevitsky stan (now Zaraysky District, Moscow Oblast), on the Osyotrik river, the righthand tributary of the Osyotr river, namely at the mouth of its tributary, a small river called Yamna. This village is now extinct. It was purchased by Timofey (Vasilyevich?) Kobuzev circa 1530s. In the late 16th century the half of the village was state-owned and allotted in fiefdom to various gentry. Half of the village was shared by the Kobuzevs and the Birkins. In 1601 the village was completely bought up by the Birkin family.
 Tyutkosvkoe (Russian: Тютковское), a village in Perevitsky stan, an allod. In 1649, passed to the Likharyov family for overdue mortgage
 Staroe Kobusevo (Russian: Старое Кобузева; extinct) a village in the area of Likhvin (now Chekalin, Tula oblast), the Duchy of Odoyev; an allod, owned by the family until the late 1400s.
Kobuzevo (Trufanovo), Gorodsky stan, Uglich uyezd.
 An estate at Novosyolky-  (Russian: Новосёлки-Инякино) in Perevitsky stan (now: Zaraysk district, Moscow Oblast), owned in fiefdom. The estate at Inyakino was first received by Ivan Fyodorov syn Kobuzev, grandson of Tymofey Kobuzev, before 1575. 
 A half of Duryshkino with the Timiryazesvkoe estate (Russian: Дурышкино с сельцом Тимирязевское), Kamensky stan (now: Pronsky District, Ryazan Oblast), owned in fiefdom by Alexander Sofonov syn Kobuzev since 1610. 
 An estate at Khodynino (Russian: Ходынино), Okologorodny stan (now: Rybnovsky District, Ryazan Oblast), owned in fiefdom.
  (Russian: Зимёнки-1, Зимёнки Троицкие) a village in Zaraysky District, Moscow Oblast, owned in fiefdom.
 (Kalemino), on the Kalmana river, a tributary of the Osyotr, Perevitsky stan (now Zaraysky district, Moscow Oblast), in fiefdom. 
Kobuzevo on the Oka river, Nepolotsky stan, Orlovsky uyezd.
 Kobyzevo (Russian: деревня Кобузёвская, село Кобызево, Кобзево;'' extinct), Sviyazhsk y uyezd, owned in fiefdom by Alexey Kobyzev, a Sviyazhsk Cossack ataman in 1550s.

References 

Boyars
Cossacks
Gentry
Russian noble families